The People's Almanac is a series of three books compiled in 1975, 1978 and 1981 by David Wallechinsky and his father Irving Wallace.

In 1973, Wallechinsky became fed up with almanacs that regurgitated bare facts. He had the idea for a reference book to be read for pleasure; a book that would tell the often untold true tales of history. He worked alone for 12 months before being joined by his father for a further year of research. The People's Almanac was published by Doubleday in 1975 and became a best-seller. Its success led to The People's Almanac #2 in 1978 and The People's Almanac #3 in 1981, both published by William Morrow and Company.

One of the most popular chapters was a selection of lists, which spawned The Book of Lists.

The People's Almanac books depart from conventional almanacs (such as the World Almanac) by including many entertaining facts, lists and esoteric knowledge. Special sections include ones on natural and man-made disasters, "Footnote People in World History," biographies of fictional characters (such as Superman), past predictions by psychics—both correct and incorrect, and predictions for the years 1975 and on. Odd and unexplained happenings (such as the Devil's Footprints) are also discussed, though authoritative references are generally not given.

References

1975 non-fiction books
1978 non-fiction books
1981 non-fiction books
Almanacs
Books by David Wallechinsky
Books by Irving Wallace
Doubleday (publisher) books
William Morrow and Company books
Series of books
Trivia books